Early parliamentary elections were held in Greece on 4 October 2009. Elections were not required until September 2011, but on 2 September 2009 Prime Minister Kostas Karamanlis of New Democracy announced that he would request President Karolos Papoulias dissolve Parliament and call elections. Parliament was dissolved on 9 September.

The result was a victory for the opposition PASOK party led by George Papandreou, who became the new Prime Minister. New Democracy lost 61 of its 152 seats, with its vote share dropping by over 8 percentage points.

Voting was mandatory; however there are no sanctions or penalties for not voting.

Participating parties
A total of 23 parties participated in the elections. Six of them participated in only one or two parliamentary constituencies.

New Democracy
PASOK
Communist Party of Greece
Popular Orthodox Rally
Coalition of the Radical Left
Ecologists Greens
Marxist-Leninist Communist Party of Greece
Communist Party of Greece (Marxist-Leninist)
Workers Revolutionary Party
Democratic Revival (Stelios Papathemelis)
Union of Centrists (Vassilis Leventis)
Popular Union – Chrysi Avyi
Dimosthenis Vergis – Greek Ecologists
Organization for the Reconstruction of the Communist Party of Greece
Koinonia (Emmanouil Voloudakis)
Democrats (Δημοκρατικοί) (M. Meletopoulos)
Anticapitalist Left Cooperation for the Overthrow (ANTARSYA)
Light – Truth – Justice (Φως – Αλήθεια – Δικαιοσύνη) (Konstantinos Melissourgos)2
Friends of Man (Φίλοι του Ανθρώπου) (K. Stamoulis)1
Regional Urban Development (Περιφερειακή Αστική Ανάπτυξη) (South Kolitsi)1
Old Republic (Παλαιά Δημοκρατία) (A. Daskalopoulos)1
Smoking Groups for Art and Artistic Creation (Καπνιστικές Ομάδες για την Τέχνη και την Εικαστική Συγκρότηση, ΚΟΤΕΣ), (Nikos Louvros)1
I Give Away Land, I Give Away Debts - Panagrarian Labour Movement of Greece (Χαρίζω Οικόπεδα, Χαρίζω Χρέη' - Παναγροτικό Εργατικό Κίνημα Ελλάδος), (M. Tzalazidis)2
1 The party ran in one parliamentary constituency.
2 The party ran in two parliamentary constituencies.

Opinion polls

Events before the election

September 11, 2009: "Ecologists Greece" announced their electoral alliance with the Popular Orthodox Rally (LAOS)
September 16, 2009: A total of 28 parties submitted candidate lists to the Areios Pagos.  The court will vet the candidacies' legal standing and officially declare lawful candidates within about a week.  In past elections, some candidacies were rejected because the candidates had held certain public offices which they had not resigned in a timely fashion.
September 21, 2009: NET state television, in simulcast with major commercial TV stations, broadcast the debate among the leaders of ND, PASOK, KKE, SYRIZA, LAOS, and the Ecologist Greens. The party leaders questioned by a team of journalists from the TV stations participating in the simulcast. Questions and responses were rotated and timed. Each party leader was allowed to place one question to one other party leader of their choice directly.
September 21, 2009: The Areios Pagos announced the parties participating in the elections. 5 of the 28 applications were rejected; namely: "Ecologists Greece – Konstantinos Papanikolas – Political Catharsis", "Hellenic Direct Democracy Movement" (Ελληνικό Κίνημα Άμεσης Δημοκρατίας - Giorgos Kokkas), "New Greek Republic" (Νέα Ελληνική Δημοκρατία - N. Laskos), "Where are you, Papadopoulos? – Party of Greek Aliens – Terrorise the Terrorists" (Πού είσαι Παπαδόπουλε – Κόμμα Ελλήνων Αλλοδαπών – Τρομοκρατήστε τους Τρομοκράτες), "Future of the Greeks - Servants of the Greek People" (Μέλλον των Ελλήνων – Υπηρέτες του Ελληνικού Λαού - N. Skopelitis).
September 22, 2009:  The two likely Prime Ministers, Kostas Karamanlis and George Papandreou, debated for 75 minutes.  The debate was divided in 5 sections (the economy, education, administration, the environment, and foreign policy). Both leaders had 2 sessions of 3 minutes and 1 session of 1 minute. The moderator had 1 minute to introduce the subject.  The debate was moderated by journalist Maria Houkli, and was simulcast as per the multi-party debate above.
October 3, 2009: It was announced that seven pollsters pooled their resources to conduct a joint exit poll, which was broadcast by all TV and news stations at 7 PM, the time when voting officially ended.  The pollsters procured approximately 14,000 randomised responses and were aiming for a ±1.5% margin of error in their earliest predictions.  Singular Logic, the IT contractor for the Ministry of Interior, implemented a secure system to obtain initial tallies from approximately 4,000 voting stations by SMS.  They were thus able to project final results within ±0.2% by 9 PM and within ±0.1% by midnight.
October 3, 2009: Publicised odds by international bookmakers were roughly in agreement with the latest predictions as outlined in the tables above.  Sports betting is the only form of betting allowed in Greece.
October 4, 2009: Voting commenced at 7 AM and was completed at 7 PM, in 20,937 stations throughout the country.  Turnout was estimated at slightly more than 7 million.

Exit polls and projections
The initial results of the exit poll conducted jointly by pollsters Alco, GPO, MARC, Metron Analysis, MRB, Opinion, and RASS were made public at 7 PM Eastern European DST:

The revised results of the exit poll conducted jointly by pollsters Alco, GPO, MARC, Metron Analysis, MRB, Opinion, and RASS were made public at 8:50 PM Eastern European DST.  The margin of error claimed is less than 0.5%:

The statistical projections by Singular Logic and the Ministry of Interior, based on actual returns, were made public at 9 PM Eastern European DST.  The margin of error claimed is 0.3%:

Results

By region

Post-election events

October 4, 2009:  Incumbent Prime Minister and New Democracy party leader Kostas Karamanlis conceded defeat and stated that he is resigning his offices, and will not stand as candidate at the party convention summoned to elect his successor next month.  The 33.5% tally marks a historic low for the party since its founding in 1974.
October 5, 2009:  The Speaker of the outgoing Parliament notified the President of the Republic about the election returns.  Immediately afterwards incumbent Prime Minister Kostas Karamanlis tended his resignation to the President. PASOK leader George Papandreou was then summoned by the President and given a mandate to form a Cabinet as the Prime Minister-designate. PASOK Member of the European Parliament Stavros Lambrinidis said the result was "remarkable".
October 6, 2009: George Papandreou was sworn in as Prime Minister at 11 AM, and moved into the Máximos Mansion, the Prime Ministerial office.  The names of the new ministers were announced at 7 PM.  It became known that George Papandreou had offered the EcoGreens one of the two positions of Undersecretary for the Environment, but the offer was turned down.
October 7, 2009: The new Cabinet was sworn in at 11 AM.  The New Democracy party congress is to convene and elect its new leader at November 7, 2009.

References

Further reading

External links
Greece Votes Socialist by Maria Margaronis, The Nation, October 5, 2009
 NSD: European Election Database - Greece publishes regional level election data; allows for comparisons of election results, 1990–2009

Greece
Legislative
2009 in Greek politics
Parliamentary elections in Greece
Greece